Parliamentary elections were held in Nicaragua on 7 October 1934 to elect half of the seats in the Chamber of Deputies and one-third of the seats in the Senate of the National Congress.

Results

References

Elections in Nicaragua
Nicaragua
1934 in Nicaragua
October 1934 events
Election and referendum articles with incomplete results